This list of country-specific lists details the military equipment used by NATO. The page is separated by country and is organised alphabetically. After the country-specific lists is an overview of NATO military equipment, as well as information about NATO forces as a whole, split into armies, air forces and navies. This section is based on the information in the lists that precede it. As of 12 of May 2022, Sweden and Finland are planning to join NATO soon, and a final section discusses the impact of their equipment and soldiers on NATO's strength.

A

Albania 

 List of equipment of the Albanian Armed Forces

B

Belgium 

 List of equipment of the Belgian armed forces    
 Belgian Air Component
 Belgian Navy

Bulgaria 

 List of modern equipment of the Bulgarian land forces
 Bulgarian Air Force
 Bulgarian Navy

C

Canada 

 List of equipment of the Canadian Army
 Royal Canadian Air Force
 List of current ships of the Royal Canadian Navy

Croatia 

 List of equipment of the Croatian Army
 Croatian Air Force
 List of active Croatian Navy ships

Czech Republic 

 List of equipment of the Czech Republic

D

Denmark 

 List of equipment of the Royal Danish Army
 Royal Danish Air Force
 List of active Royal Danish Navy ships

E

Estonia 

 List of equipment of the Estonian Defence Forces
 Estonian Air Force
 List of active Estonian Navy ships

F

France 

 List of equipment of the French Army
 French Air and Space Force
 List of active French Navy ships

G

Germany 

 List of modern equipment of the German Army
 German Air Force
 List of active German Navy ships

Greece 

 List of equipment of the Hellenic Army
 Hellenic Air Force
 List of active Hellenic Navy ships

H

Hungary 

 List of equipment of the Hungarian Ground Forces
 Hungarian Air Force

I

Iceland 

 Defence of Iceland

Italy 

 List of equipment of the Italian Army
 Italian Air Force
 Italian Navy

L

Latvia 

 List of equipment of the Latvian Land Forces
 Latvian National Guard
 Latvian Air Force
 Latvian Naval Forces

Lithuania 

 List of equipment of the Lithuanian Armed Forces
 Lithuanian Air Force
 Lithuanian Naval Force

Luxembourg 

 Luxembourg Armed Forces

M

Montenegro 

 Equipment of the Armed Forces of Montenegro

N

Netherlands 

 List of equipment of the Royal Netherlands Army
 Royal Netherlands Air Force
 List of active Royal Netherlands Navy ships

North Macedonia 

 List of equipment of the Army of North Macedonia
 North Macedonia Air Brigade

Norway 

 List of equipment of the Norwegian Army
 Royal Norwegian Air Force
 List of Royal Norwegian Navy ships

P

Poland 

 List of equipment of the Polish Land Forces
 Polish Air Force
 List of ships of the Polish Navy

Portugal 

 List of equipment of the Portuguese Army
 Portuguese Air Force
 List of active Portuguese Navy ships

R

Romania 

 List of equipment of the Romanian Armed Forces

S

Slovakia 

 List of equipment of the Slovak Army
 Slovak Air Force

Slovenia 

 Slovenian Armed Forces

Spain 

 Spanish Army
 Spanish Air and Space Force
 Spanish Navy

T

Turkey 

 List of equipment of the Turkish Land Forces
 Turkish Air Force
 List of active ships of the Turkish Naval Forces

U

United Kingdom 

 List of equipment of the British Army
 Royal Air Force
 List of active Royal Navy ships

United States 

 List of equipment of the United States Army
 United States Air Force
 List of current ships of the United States Navy

Armies and small arms, vehicles, artillery and air defence systems

Armies 
The biggest army in NATO, by a significant margin, is the United States Army with 485,000 regular personnel, as of 2021. The US army is followed by the Turkish Army with 260,200 personnel. Most European members of NATO have total active personnel for their armies in the tens of thousands. Exceptions would be the Greek and French Armies which have 100,000 and 118,000 personnel respectively. The Italian Army has just under 100,000 and the British Army is relatively large at 82,040. Other exceptions include the Albanian Army with 8,500 personnel, the Slovenian Ground Force with 7,300 personnel, the Army of North Macedonia with 6,100 personnel, the Army of Montenegro with 1,500 personnel, and the Luxembourg Armed Forces with 950 personnel. Iceland does not have a standing army and its only defense force is the Icelandic Coast Guard with 3 ships and 4 aircraft.

Ammo 
The standard NATO ammunition for service small arms is 5.56mm NATO, although 7.62mm NATO is still in use with machine guns and sniper rifles. However, some former Warsaw pact countries now in NATO still use the standard Russian assault rifle round for their Kalashnikov rifles. 9mm Parabellum is  still in use for sidearms. The 12.7mm NATO cartridge, also known as the .50 BMG, is standard for heavy machine guns. Tank ammo has similarly also been standardised across NATO with 120×570mm NATO ammunition being in use in all NATO tanks except the British Challenger 2. All NATO tank ammo having the same dimensions means a round from any NATO country can be fired in any NATO tank. For example, a Leopard 2 can fire American M829 tank ammo and vice versa. Western aligned countries such as Israel, Japan and South Korea also make ammo to NATO standard dimensions.

Small arms  
A relatively large amount of NATO standard service arms are from the M16 family of assault rifles, such as the M4 carbine, Colt Canada C7 and Heckler & Koch HK416. Former Warsaw pact countries still use rifles from the AK family. Other assault rifles in NATO service are the Steyr AUG, Heckler & Koch G36, FN SCAR, SA 80, Beretta AR70/90, Beretta ARX160, CZ 805 BREN and HS Produkt VHS. Note that while the FAMAS  is still used by France in 2022, it is set to soon be replaced by the HK 416. NATO sidearms are from large commercial pistol manufacturers, which are Beretta with the Beretta 92, SIG Sauer with the SIG Sauer M17, Glock with its Glock pistol, Heckler & Koch with the Heckler & Koch USP and CZUB with their CZ 75. Machine guns are usually either a 5.56 FN Minimi or 7.62 FN MAG both made by FN Herstal. However Germany makes its own machine guns: the 5.56mm MG4 and the 7.62mm MG5. Denmark uses a modernised version of the Cold War US M60. The old MG 3 machine gun is still in service with the Bundeswehr and in the armies of other NATO members although it is being phased out by the Bundeswehr and should be replaced by the MG4 and MG 5 soon as of 2022. NATO has a very wide variety of infantry anti-tank weapons which are the FGM-148 Javelin, M72 LAW, NLAW, Panzerfaust 3, MATADOR, Carl Gustaf, AT4, Spike, C90-CR (M3), Eryx, MILAN, Missile Moyenne Portée, RPG-75, RPG-7 and the 9K111 Fagot. The only anti-tank weapons that are not in widespread use in NATO is the French Eryx, only used by France and Turkey, the Missile Moyenne Portée, also only in use with France, and the British and Swedish NLAW, only used by the United Kingdom. For infantry anti-aircraft weapons, NATO countries possess various Man-portable air-defense systems, such as the FIM-92 Stinger, Starstreak, and Piorun (missile). The Stinger and Mistral missiles are commonly used throughout NATO, while the Starstreak and Piorun missiles are only used in their country of origin.

Armoured fighting vehicles 
In terms of MBT's there are 5 types in NATO that are modern enough for a peer conflict with Russia that are talked about below. The majority of NATO members use the Leopard 2 as their main tank, with some countries such as Spain and Poland having their own variants. The Leopard 2A4 is the most widely used variant but this is the least modern variant in current use. NATO also uses the variants developed after the 2A4: the 2A5, 2A6 and 2A7. The US M1 Abrams tank is mainly used by the US, although Poland uses them alongside their Leopard 2's. This makes Poland the only NATO country other than the US to operate the Abrams. The M1 Abrams is in service in large numbers with the US army and the Leopard 2 is in widespread service throughout NATO, making these tank types the bulk of NATO's armoured strength. Other tanks that are available in small numbers are the Challenger 2, Leclerc and Ariete. These tanks are only used in NATO by their respective countries. There are roughly 200 tanks in service for each tank type, making a total of 800, plus roughly 1500 Leopard 2's and roughly 2500 M1 Abrams, the majority of which are M1A2's and the rest M1A1's. Therefore, roughly half of NATO's tank strength is composed of American M1 Abrams tanks and the other half of European Leopard 2s  with smaller amounts of Challenger 2's, Leclerc's and Ariete's. While the tanks previously listed are the main NATO tank forces, other NATO members operate obsolete Cold War era tanks from both the West and the Soviet Union. Some of those Soviet tanks are domestic variants of an original Soviet design. The countries that operate these tanks also do not have the ability to deploy them abroad so they still could not be used in NATO operations against poorly armed opponents where they might be useful. In terms of infantry fighting vehicles, there is slightly more variety due to the lower cost when compared to a tank. The US M2 Bradley makes up a substantial amount of infantry fighting vehicles in NATO with the US operating roughly 6,000. Other IFV's in NATO have hundreds of each type depending on which exact one present in NATO. These IFV's are the Puma, Warrior, Dardo, Freccia, ASCOD, Combat Vehicle 90, VBCI, LAV III,BMP-1and the BMP-2. The total for all these IFV's is roughly around 5000, meaning the US has roughly half of NATO's IFV's. The previous list does not include anything that could be described as an IFV but is not classified as such, like a Stryker, Boxer or Piranha. In terms of other armoured fighting vehicles, a lot of NATO members operate wheeled APC's and IFV's to carry infantry, the difference being an IFV would be employed with an infantry squad that was meant to work with tanks and a wheeled APC would be employed with independent infantry that were not supposed to cooperate with any tanks. These are the Stryker, Boxer and Piranha as mentioned earlier and the Patria AMV, Patria Pasi, Pandur II and Pandur I. The majority of modern wheeled Armored fighting vehicles in NATO are Strykers at roughly 4,500. The next most widely available wheeled APC is the Patria AMV, with Poland having a large amount (roughly 1000 vehicles) and other NATO members employing much smaller numbers. Next is the Boxer with roughly 800 in NATO use, with that number going up to 1400 by 2022, as the British Army ordered roughly 600 additional vehicles. The second least used is the MOWAG Piranha with roughly 500 in service in NATO. The modern wheeled AFV in the smallest numbers in NATO is the Pandur II with 250. The majority is used by Portugal and a smaller amount is used by Czechoslovakia. Slovenia has also made a request for 14 Pandur II as they already operate Pandur I. Older vehicles still in use as APC's but with tracks are the M113 armored personnel carrier and ELVO Leonidas-2. Most AFV's can also be configured into specialist vehicles as in most militaries.

Artillery 
The main and most widespread self propelled artillery vehicles in NATO service are the M109 howitzer and Panzerhaubitze 2000. Other than these, as of 2022, only one country in NATO operates the AS-90, AMX-30 AuF1, K9 Thunder,T-155 Fırtına and AHS Krab self propelled artillery which is their country of origin except for the K9 Thunder which is Korean but operated by Norway. The CAESAR self-propelled howitzer is unusual for a self propelled artillery vehicle as it is unarmoured. The CAESAR is, as of 2022, soon going to be used by multiple NATO members. The Czech 152 mm SpGH DANA self propelled artillery is also unarmoured and used by multiple NATO members. In terms of towed artillery in NATO service some countries still use old Cold War US and Soviet or even World War II US towed artillery pieces as well old US self propelled ones from the Cold War. In terms of modern non-self propelled artillery in NATO, there is the L118 light gun as well as the FH70, which are both used by multiple NATO countries. The M777 howitzer only in use by US and Canada. In terms of MLRS, the most widespread unit is the M270 Multiple Launch Rocket System. M142 HIMARS is only used by US and Romania and RM-70 multiple rocket launcher by Greece, Poland and Slovakia. Only Poland uses WR-40 Langusta.

Air defence systems 
The main air defence system in NATO is the MIM-104 Patriot. Others in use are NASAMS, CAMM and in Eastern Europe, the Cold War Soviet 2K12 Kub. THAAD is a system designed to only intercept ballistic missiles and is in use in NATO by only the US.

Aircraft

Fighters 

The majority of NATO fighters are General Dynamics F-16 Fighting Falcons. This is due to the fighter being made in relatively large quantities, widespread use by the US airforce and the selling of F-16's to US NATO allies, like Turkey, Poland and the Netherlands. The Eurofighter Typhoon is also commonly used in NATO, although not in the same quantities as the F-16, with the European nations United Kingdom, Germany, Italy and Spain using it as their main fighter. The Lockheed Martin F-35 Lightning II is also available in quantity in NATO and are growing in numbers with the US having a relatively large amount in service and smaller numbers being operated by individual NATO countries generally. The Dassault Rafale is for now only used by France and a small amount was acquired by Greece in 2020 and so is only available in small quantities. The McDonnell Douglas F/A-18 Hornet is also available, although in smaller quantities than even the Rafale, with the fighter being used by Spain and by Canada as Canada's McDonnell Douglas CF-18 Hornet, a modernised variant of the Hornet. There is an extremely small number of Saab JAS 39 Gripen operated by the Czech and Hungarian airforce, with each country operating 14, making 28 in total.

Attack helicopters 
Boeing AH-64 Apache is the most widely used attack helicopter in NATO, mainly because hundreds are in US service along with smaller amounts serving with the UK, Netherlands and Greece. Eurocopter Tiger is also present in quantity in NATO with France, Germany and Spain.

Ships 
The US Navy forms the bulk of NATO's naval strength through large numbers as well as having the most advanced aircraft carriers in the world. The majority of European Navies only operate frigates and smaller craft to protect their own waters and lack a substantially armed "blue sea" navy. However, the British, French, Italian, and Spanish Navies hold a significant amount of naval power which is a strong addition to the US Navy to improve NATO's naval strength. They all operate destroyers to escort their carriers, although Spain designates their destroyers as frigates.

The US operates 11 aircraft carriers and the Royal Navy operates 2 aircraft carriers as does the Italian Navy. France and Spain both have 1 aircraft carrier. A significant amount of NATO carriers are not US and, while not being as advanced, most operate modern aircraft, except Spain, so they are a significant NATO asset that increases NATO naval power considerably. Despite not being blue water navies the German, Dutch, Danish, Norwegian and Turkish navies have ships that could make a significant difference when part of a NATO carrier strike group or task force at sea.

If Sweden and Finland join NATO 
This will discuss what Sweden and Finland could contribute to NATO starting with their armies then their airforces and finally their navies.

Army 
The Finnish army today has roughly 21,000 personnel and the Swedish Army 24,000. So if they join NATO the organisation would have roughly 45,000 more personnel some of which are soldiers which is a significant increase in the number of professional army personnel in  NATO. The main Swedish service rifle is the Ak 5 and for Finland it is the  RK 62. Both Finland and Sweden have a lot of anti-aircraft and anti-tank weapons already in NATO use. Sweden operates  120  Stridsvagn 122 tanks a Swedish variant of the Leopard 2 while Finland operates roughly 200 Leopard 2 tank with roughly half being old Leopard 2A4 and the other half modern Leopard 2A6. So if Finland and Sweden joined NATO this would increase  the rough number of Leopard 2 tanks in NATO to 1800 from 1500 which is a big increase. Finland and Sweden combined have roughly 450 Combat vehicle 90 infantry fighting vehicles and Finland also has roughly 100  BMP-2MD's a Finnish variant of the BMP-2 that modernises the vehicle. This means that Finland and Sweden together could contribute an extra 550 infantry fighting vehicles to NATO which is a lot. Sweden also has 113 Patria AMV and Finland 62 increasing the number in NATO by 175 vehicles added to the roughly 1000 already in service. Sweden also operates 48 Archer Artillery System and Finland roughly 100 self propelled artillery with roughly a quarter being K9 Thunder and the other three quarters  being  2S1 Gvozdika.

Air Force 
Sweden possesses 73 Saab JAS 39 Gripen fighter aircraft, with 60 more on order, as well as more than 100 miscellaneous aircraft such as transport aircraft, trainer aircraft, and helicopters. Finland has 55 McDonnell Douglas F/A-18 Hornets fighter aircraft, and 64 F-35A fighter aircraft on order. Finland also has more than 120 other aircraft, such as 37 BAE Systems Hawk trainers that can reportedly be converted into fighter aircraft.

Navy 
Sweden has corvettes and submarines and Finland is in the process of getting Corvettes and currently has Missile boats. The Swedish and Finnish navies joining NATO would further increase the local superiority of NATO naval forces against the Russian Baltic Fleet with the addition of the Finnish and Swedish navies to the Norwegian, Danish, German and Polish navies from NATO operating in or near the Baltic. The Swedish Gotland Class submarines are of note as HSwMS Gotland (Gtd) the first ship of the class could have been able to sink USS Ronald Reagan while protected by its carrier strike group while it was acting as a hostile submarine in an exercise that was designed to test whether a US carrier strike group could defend its carrier against a diesel electric submarine.

References 

NATO
military equipment